Jighansa is a Bengali thriller film based on Sir Arthur Conan Doyle's The Hound of the Baskervilles released on 20 April 1951. It was directed by Ajoy Kar and musical scores are done by Hemant Kumar.

Plot 
The movie revolves around the unwanted incidents that happen in the princely state Ratnagarh. After the murder of the king Chandrakanta, Dr. Palit asks for help from Detective Smarajit Sen, a family friend. Detective Sen sends his assistant Bimal to Ratnagarh to investigate and ascertain the security of young Kumar Bahadur, new predecessors of the royal family of the estate. They observe that a mysterious lady, Manjusri, sings uncanny song in the adjacent water body near the palace. Mr. Gupta, a suspicious botanist, stays in the neighbourhood also roamed in that locality. It is revealed that he was deprived of real property of the royal family and took revenge by killing the members of the family. He uses a deaf and dumb porter as a hired killer. Ultimately, he is killed by the detective at the end before he could commit another murder.

Cast 
 Manju Dey as Manjusri
 Bikash Roy as Mr. Gupta
 Kamal Mitra as Dr. Palit
 Sisir Batabyal as Smarajit Sen
 Biren Chattopadhyay as Kumar Bahadur
 Goutam Mukhopadhyay as Bimal 
 Kanu Bandyopadhyay
 Santosh Sinha
 Dhiraj Das
 Kalipada Sarkar
 Pannalal Chakraborty
 Pushpa Debi
 Romola Chowdhuri
 Sushama Ghosh

Adaptation 
This was the first film adaptation of the celebrated Sherlock Holmes story, The Hound of the Baskervilles in Bengali. 11 years later, a remake was made in Hindi, Bees Saal Baad directed by Biren Nag and produced and musical scores by Hemanta Mukherjee.

References

External links
 

1951 films
Bengali-language Indian films
Sherlock Holmes films
1950s Bengali-language films
Films directed by Ajoy Kar
1950s thriller films
Indian thriller films
Films based on The Hound of the Baskervilles
Bengali films remade in other languages
Films scored by Hemant Kumar